Oketo can refer to:

 Oketo, Hokkaidō, Japan
 Oketo, California, United States
 Oketo, Kansas, United States
 Oketo (band), indie rock band from Lincoln, NE